Saturn is a German chain of electronics stores in Germany. With Media Markt it constitutes Media-Saturn Holding, owned by the retail trade company Ceconomy, which was spun-off from Metro Group in 2017. 
  
As of December 2021, there are 137 Saturn stores in Germany  and 2 in Luxembourg. The Saturn store in Hamburg is the largest electronics store in the world.

On 1 July 2011 the 34 Saturn stores in France were sold to the HTM Group.

Saturn stores in Austria, Belgium, Greece, Hungary, Luxembourg, the Netherlands, Poland, Russia, Spain, Switzerland and Turkey have been rebranded as Media Markt and in Italy as Media World.

Saturn is known for its slightly coarse German-language advertising slogan "Geiz ist geil!" ("Stinginess is cool!") which was used from 2002 to 2011 and sparked a nationwide debate about consumer behavior and the situation of the German economy. The slogan quickly became common language and became synonymous with the German economic crisis.

History
The first Saturn-Hansa-Markt was opened in July 1961 by Friedrich Wilhelm and Anni Waffenschmidt at Cologne's Hansaring. Consumer electronics items were mainly sold to "diplomats from all over the world" on 120 m². In 1968 the two founded the company Hansa-Foto. Since 1969, private customers have also been able to shop at Saturn and Hansa-Foto. In 1972, the Waffenschmidts opened the first technical department store in Cologne with what they claimed to be the "largest phonograph record in the world". In the early 1980s, a large branch was opened on the Theresienhöhe in Munich, followed in 1985 by a branch in Frankfurt with the participation of Kaufhof. Saturn was acquired by the Media Markt holding company in 1990, both of which were merged into the MediaMarktSaturn Retail Group.

In 1992 there were seven Saturn Hansa stores (Cologne, Frankfurt, Munich, Dortmund, Hanover, Nuremberg, Gelsenkirchen).

The area of a market is usually between 2,000 m² and 10,000 m². An exception can be found in Hamburg with 18,000 m² and six floors which makes it one of the largest electronics stores in the world. Its origins relate to the merger of the Horten and Kaufhof department stores in 1995. In Hamburg, Kaufhof and Horten had stores side by side in Mönckebergstrasse, at the main train station. Both Saturn and Kaufhof were part of the Metro Group, so the Horten store was closed and occupied in 1999 with the electronics store.

References

External links
 Saturn Europe
 Saturn Germany
 Saturn Luxembourg

Retail companies established in 1961
Consumer electronics retailers of Germany
Retail companies of Germany
Metro Group

de:Media-Saturn-Holding#Marke „Saturn“